The Folville gang were an armed band operating in Leicestershire in the early 14th century, led by Eustace Folville.

Criminal career

The Slaying of Roger Beler 1326

In January 1326 Eustace led a band of fifty men to a valley near Rearsby and ambushed and killed the corrupt Baron of the Exchequer and ardent supporter of the Despencers, Sir Roger de Beler, who had previously made threats of violence to Eustace, his family and neighbours. An arrest warrant was issued on 24 January to apprehend those involved in the murder. A further warrant was issued to Henry, Earl of Leicester on 28 February.

On 1 March a warrant was issued to multiple commissioners and named the suspects as;

 Ralph son of Roger la Zouch of Lubbesthorpe
 Eustace Folville and his brothers Robert, Walter and Rev. Richard Folville, Vicar of Teigh
 Adam de Barleye
 William de Barkeston of Bitham
 Roger son of Sir Roger la Zouch, Lord of Lubbesthorpe
 Ivo/Eudo son of Sir William la Zouch, 1st Baron Zouche of Harringworth
 Sir Robert de Hellewell

The listing of the la Zouches of Lubbesthorpe first implies their leadership, which is backed up by an order on 24 March to the Sheriff of Leicestershire to seize the lands of Sir Roger la Zouch, Lord of Lubbesthorpe as he had been indicted of "assenting to and counselling" the death of Roger de Beler. La Zouch no doubt had a personal grudge against Beler stemming from the arrest warrant against him in 1324 as well as Beler's desertion from the rebels' side after the Battle of Boroughbridge in 1322. The Folvilles may have been mercenaries hired by the la Zouches but Beler's previous threats probably persuaded them that his removal would be a good thing in itself.

A further warrant on 18 Mar added the following names to the murderers

 Robert son of Simon de Hauberk of Scalford
 John de Stafford and his brother William

On 14 March a warrant was issued to Edmund de Ashby, Sheriff of Leics to arrest Thomas Folville for aiding Ralph son of Roger la Zouch of Lubbesthorpe, Eustace Folville and others escape from England. The fugitives fled first to Wales and then to Paris to join Queen Isabella, Mortimer and Trussell where they lost one of their band, Ivo/Eudo la Zouch, perhaps from wounds received in the attack on Beler or their subsequent flight from England. Ivo/Eudo was buried in the church of the friars of St Augustine, Paris on 27 April.

Queen Isabella, Mortimer and Trussell started their Invasion of England by landing at Orwell, Suffolk, on 24 September 1326 with a small army of about 1500 (perhaps including the recently exiled Folville gang) but were quickly joined by a very large number of people discontent with the reign of Edward and the Despencers.

On 28 September a general pardon was issued by King Edward to all outlaws provided that they helped defend against the invasion. The only people excluded from the pardon were Mortimer and the Folville gang, who Edward obviously suspected were intrinsically linked.

Opposition to the invasion proved to be almost non-existent and so many barons, sheriffs and knights joined the rebellion that they gained control within just two months. Both Hugh le Despencer, Earl of Winchester and his son Hugh Despenser the Younger were quickly and gruesomely executed by Mortimer once captured.

A pardon for the Folvilles was rushed through and granted on 11 February 1327, presumably on the request of Roger Mortimer, now the new fourteen year old king's Steward, and the new Speaker of the House of Commons, Sir William Trussell, just ten days after Edward III had been crowned as the new king.

Outlawry
The fourteenth-century legal system included practices of vigilantism and retribution. Debts were often recovered using force, disputes resolved by duels and judges were only involved when all else failed. The Folvilles, finding themselves as 'heroes of the revolution' (at least locally, having saved their neighbours from the nefarious acts of Despencer and Belers), became emboldened and continued to commit acts of retribution and, as the years went by, found themselves on both sides of the law being repeatedly outlawed and then pardoned.

Upon their return to Leicestershire after the revolution they initially appear to have targeted Beler's lands at Kirby Bellars and elsewhere but within a few years petitions were issued to the Sheriff of Nottingham, 'complaining that two of the Folville brothers were roaming abroad again at the head of a band, waylaying persons whom they spoiled and held to ransom'.

Various indictments from the period portray Eustace and his brothers as freelance mercenaries, hired 'by the ostensibly law-abiding...to commit acts of violence on their behalf'. Members of Sempringham Priory and Haverholm Abbey, both in Lincolnshire, seem to have made use of their services, and at one stage they were under the patronage of Sir Robert Tuchet, a major lord of Derbyshire and Cheshire.

The Ransom of Richard Willoughby 1332
The justice Sir Richard Willoughby, another one of corrupt commissioners appointed in 1323 to arrest William Trussell and Roger la Zouch, was appointed to apprehend Eustace and his brothers Robert, Walter and John in January 1331 for allegedly stealing horse, oxen and sheep from Henry de Beaumont.

It seems it took a long time for Willioughby to fulfil his duty and it was not until the next year when he caught up with his prey; unfortunately rather than capturing them they instead kidnapped the judge. Willoughby was ransomed for the large sum of 1300 marks and released.

The Folville gang did not answer to the charges brought against them and fled to Derbyshire where they "rode with armed force secretly and openly", allied with the Coterel gang and were sheltered by Sir Robert Tuchet, Lord of Markeaton.

In popular culture
A fictionalized version of the Folville Gang is the focus of the medieval crime novel series ″The Folville Chronicles″ by Jennifer Ash, beginning with ″The Outlaw's Ransom″ in 2017, reissued in 2018 by Littwitz Press. (An earlier version of the novel appeared as part of ″Romancing Robin Hood″ by Ash under her Jenny Kane pseudonym.

Notes

References

Works cited

 
 
 
 
 
 
 
 

Medieval English criminals
English outlaws
14th-century English people
Medieval thieves
Gangs in England
14th-century criminals